Brighton Mhlongo (born 12 January 1991) is a South African football (soccer) goalkeeper who plays for Premier Soccer League club Chippa United.

International career
Mhlongo was called up to the senior South Africa squad for the 2017 Africa Cup of Nations qualifier against Gambia in June 2016. He made his national team debut on the friendly match against Ghana on 11 October 2016.

References

1991 births
Living people
Sportspeople from Soweto
Zulu people
South African soccer players
Association football goalkeepers
Orlando Pirates F.C. players
F.C. AK players
Chippa United F.C. players
Garankuwa United F.C. players
South Africa international soccer players